Falling in Love or Fallin' in Love may refer to:
 Falling in love, the process of developing strong romantic feelings for another individual

Film and television 
 Falling in Love (1935 film), a British comedy film
 Falling in Love (1984 film), an American romantic drama starring Meryl Streep and Robert De Niro
 Falling in Love (TV series), a Malaysian-Singaporean drama

Music

Albums 
 Falling in Love (Rachelle Ann Go album) (2009)
 Falling in Love (Toni Gonzaga album) (2007)
 Fallin' in Love (album), a 1975 album by Hamilton, Joe Frank & Reynolds
Falling in Love, a 1984 album by BZN

Songs 
 "Falling in Love (Is Hard on the Knees)", a song by Aerosmith (1997)
 "Fallin' in Love" (Hamilton, Joe Frank & Reynolds song) (1975)
 "Falling in Love" (Ironik song) (2009)
 "Falling in Love" (McFly song) (2010)
 "Falling in Love (Uh-Oh)", a song by Miami Sound Machine featuring Gloria Estefan (1986)
 "Falling in Love" (Surface song) (1983)
 "Fallin' in Love" (Sylvia song) (1985)
 "Falling in Love" (Taio Cruz song) (2011)
 "Falling in Love" (2NE1 song) (2013)
 "Lady" (Dennis Wilson song), also known as "Fallin' in Love" (1970)
 "Falling in Love", a song by Cigarettes After Sex from Cry
 "Falling in Love", a song by Ira Losco
 "Falling in Love", a song by Randy Newman from Land of Dreams
 "Falling in Love", a song by Siti Nurhaliza from All Your Love
 "Falling in Love", a song by Woo Jin-young and Kim Hyun-soo from [Present]

See also
 Fall in Love (disambiguation)
 Falling in Love Again (disambiguation)
 "Falling in Love with Love", a show tune from the 1921 musical The Boys from Syracuse